Vijayachander, (born Vijayachander Telidevara), is an Indian actor, director and producer, known for his works in Telugu cinema, theatre, and television.
 Regarded as one of the finest character actor's of Telugu cinema, Vijayachander has appeared in more than forty feature films in a variety of roles.

Vijayachander is known for his path-breaking works in biographical films; He essayed Jesus of Nazareth in the 1978 film Karunamayudu which he produced, and won the Nandi Award for Best Feature Film; He then enacted his own maternal Grandfather Tanguturi Prakasam Pantulu in the 1982 film Andhra Kesari for which he has received the state Nandi Special Jury Award.

He then essayed Sai Baba of Shirdi in the 1986 classic Sri Shirdi Saibaba Mahathyam which was screened at the International Film Festival of India; In the same year, he appeared as saint Vemana in the super hit Vemana Charithra. In 1989, he starred in the Maniratnam directed Romantic drama film, Geetanjali, which won the National Film Award for Best Popular Film Providing Wholesome Entertainment. He enacted the role of Kabir in the 2003 film Kabirdas. The 2006 Tamil film Veyil was screened at the 2007 Cannes Film Festival in the "Tous Les Cinemas Du Monde" section. He received positive reviews for his performance in the social problem film Virodhi, which was screened at the Indian panorama section of the 2012 International Film Festival of India.

Personal life and family
He is the maternal grandson of brother of Tanguturi Prakasam Pantulu. Yesteryear's Telugu film singer Tanguturi Suryakumari was his maternal aunt.

Cinema
After a successful career in Telugu theatre, He made his acting debut in the film Sudigundalu (1967), which won the National Film Award for Best Feature Film in Telugu for that year. In 2007, he has donated land for old film artists and Movie Artists Association.

Television
During 1996 to 1998, he was cast in a 50-episode serial titled Dayasagar, which was telecast on DD National. The series was also dubbed into Telugu, Tamil, Hindi, Malayalam and other languages.

Selected filmography

Sudigundalu - 1968
Maro Prapancham - 1970
Budhimanthudu - 1969
Rowdy Raani - 1971
Basthi Bulbul - 1972
C.I.D. Raju - 1972
Mavoori Monagadu - 1975 
Pasivani Paga - 1975
Karunamayudu - 1978
Rajadhi Raju - 1980
Andhra Kesari - 1982
Sri Shirdi Saibaba Mahathyam - 1986
Vemana Charithra - 1986
DAYAMAYUDU-1987
Bhabali - 1987
Police Report - 1989
Geetaanjali - 1989
Jaitra Yatra - 1991
Raat - 1992
Aapad Bandhavudu - 1992 
Athma - 1993 
Big Boss - 1995
Devi Lalithamba - 1996
Suputhrudu - 1997
Bhadrachalam - 2001
Kabirdas - 2003
Ela Cheppanu - 2003
Pedababu - 2004
Relax - 2005
Veyyil - 2006 (Tamil)
Hanumanthu - 2006
Gamyam - 2008
Three - 2008
Aa Okkadu - 2009
Ratnavali - 2011
Virodhi - 2011
Aravaan - 2012 (Tamil)
Anando Brahma - 2017
N.T.R: Kathanayakudu - 2019
118 - 2019

Awards
Nandi Awards
Third Best Feature Film - Bronze - Karunamayudu (1978)
Special Jury Award - Andhra Kesari (1983)

References

External links
 

Telugu male actors
Tamil male actors
Male actors from Hyderabad, India
Indian male film actors
Nandi Award winners
Living people
Telugu film producers
Film producers from Hyderabad, India
Andhra University alumni
Indian male stage actors
Male actors in Tamil cinema
20th-century Indian male actors
21st-century Indian male actors
1949 births